Margaretha Byström (born 2 August 1937, in Stockholm) is a Swedish actress (film, theater, television), writer and director. Margaretha is most famous for her portrayal as the elegant and ambitious Katarina Remmer in the long running Swedish soap opera Rederiet.

Selected filmography
Paradise Place (1977)
A Walk in the Sun (1978)

References

External links

Swedish actresses
1937 births
Living people
Eugene O'Neill Award winners